Schuyler Colfax "Sky" Enck (January 25, 1900 – November 1, 1970) was an American athlete who competed mainly in the 800 metres. He competed for the United States in the 1924 Summer Olympics held in Paris, France in the 800 metres where he won the bronze medal.

See also
 List of Pennsylvania State University Olympians

References

External links
 

1900 births
1970 deaths
American male middle-distance runners
Olympic bronze medalists for the United States in track and field
Athletes (track and field) at the 1924 Summer Olympics
Place of birth missing
Medalists at the 1924 Summer Olympics